The AITEO Cup (a.k.a. Challenge Cup, sometimes shortened to Fed Cup), is the main football single-elimination tournament in Nigeria contested by 74 teams, representing the 36 states + 1 FCT of Nigeria. It is the Nigerian domestic cup and the Nigerian equivalent of the FA Cup, Emperor's Cup, Copa  do Brasil, Coupe de France, among others. It was created in 1945 as the "Governor's Cup", succeeding the War Memorial Challenge Cup that had been limited to teams from Lagos.

The tournament was created in 1945 as the Governor's Cup and was initially dominated by Lagosian teams, later it was known as the Nigeria FA Cup from (1954–1959), Nigeria Challenge Cup (1960–1998), Coca-Cola FA Cup (1999–2008) and Nigeria Federation Cup (2009–2016). Since 2017, the competition has been sponsored by the AITEO group and has been known as the AITEO Cup including the women's tournament.

On 8 August 2021, Bayelsa became the first state to have two clubs win the FA cup in the men's and women's editions in the same year.
Shooting Stars are the most successful clubs, having won the competition eight times, followed by the defunct Lagos Railways with 7 titles and Enugu Rangers with six titles.

Format
The competition is a single elimination knockout tournament featuring 74 teams from the 36 states + 1 FCT in Nigeria. All clubs qualify via their states cup championships, the winners and runners-up of each state cup championship qualifies for the tournament regardless of their position at the Nigerian football league system. A 'Rookie' play-off will be held for the 20 lowest ranked clubs, the 10 winners then joins the remaining 54 at the first round. All matches are held at neutral venues.

The winner qualifies automatically for the next season's CAF Confederation Cup or the runners-up if the winner  had already qualified for a CAF club competition based on league's position.

Finals

Total (not including War Memorial Cup)

References

External links
RSSSF competition history
Nigerian Football Online
Super Eagles Nation

National association football cups
Recurring sporting events established in 1960
Fa Cup